Giuseppe De Mita (born 27 April 1968) is an Italian politician and a nephew of former Prime Minister Ciriaco De Mita.

Biography 
Giuseppe De Mita is the son of Michele De Mita, brother of former Prime Minister and leader of the Christian Democracy Ciriaco De Mita. He graduated in Law at the Catholic University of Milan in 1994 and became a lawyer.

Political career 
De Mita has been a member of the Christian Democracy, of the Italian People's Party and The Daisy, with which he is elected city councilor in Avellino in 2004.

From 2007 to 2008, De Mita has been the secretary of the Democratic Party in the province of Avellino, until he left the party together with his uncle Ciriaco, joining the Union of the Centre, with which he ran unsuccessfully for the Chamber of Deputies during the 2008 general election.

After having been for one year, from 2009 to 2010, Vicepresident of the province of Avellino, De Mita has been appointed Vicepresident of Campania and Regional Councilor for Tourism and Cultural Heritage by the President of Campania Stefano Caldoro, a member of the People of Freedom. He held the office until 2013, when he is elected to the Chamber of Deputies at the 2013 general election.

In 2017, De Mita left the UDC, having opposed to an alliance between his party and the centre-right coalition and hoping to build an alliance with the Democratic Party, and founded the movement Italy is Popular, federated in the Popular Civic List.

He ran again for the Chamber of Deputies at the 2018 general election, but failed the election.

References

External links 
Files about his parliamentary activities (in Italian): XVII legislature

1968 births
Living people
People from Avellino
Christian Democracy (Italy) politicians
Italian People's Party (1994) politicians
Democracy is Freedom – The Daisy politicians
Democratic Party (Italy) politicians
Union of the Centre (2002) politicians
20th-century Italian politicians
21st-century Italian politicians
Università Cattolica del Sacro Cuore alumni